The 2023 NCAA Division III men's basketball tournament was a single-elimination tournament to determine the national champion of men's NCAA Division III college basketball in the United States. Featuring sixty-four teams, it will be played in March 2023, following the 2022–23 season, concluding with the championship game on March 18, 2023.

The national semifinal and championship rounds will again be held at the Allen County War Memorial Coliseum in Fort Wayne, Indiana. Christopher Newport won their first national championship, beating Mount Union 74–72 on a buzzer-beating layup by Trey Barber.

Tournament schedule and venues

Regionals
The first and second rounds will take place on campus sites, from March 3–4, 2023. Teams will be sent to one of sixteen locations, each hosted by one team from the group of four.

The third and fourth rounds (sectional semifinals and finals) will also take place on campus sites, from March 10–11, 2023. Teams will be sent to the home arena of one of the four teams remaining in their sectional bracket.

Final Four
The national quarterfinals semifinals and finals will be held at a predetermined site, the Allen County War Memorial Coliseum in Fort Wayne, Indiana, from March 16–18, 2023.

Qualifying teams
A total of sixty-four bids are available for the tournament: 44 automatic bids—awarded to the champions of the forty-three NCAA-recognized Division III conference tournaments—and 20 at-large bids.

While this is the first season for the newly established Collegiate Conference of the South, its conference tournament champion will not be eligible for an automatic bid until 2024.

This is also the final year that the Colonial States Athletic Conference and United East Conference receive separate bids; the two conferences will merge ahead of the 2023–24 season, consolidating their bids into one, although the name and legacy of the combined conference has not yet been announced.

Automatic bids (44)
The following 44 teams were automatic qualifiers for the 2023 NCAA field by virtue of winning their conference's automatic bid (except for the UAA, whose regular-season champion received the automatic bid).

At-large bids (20)

The following 20 teams were awarded qualification for the tournament field by the NCAA Division III Men's Basketball Committee. The committee evaluated teams on the basis of their win–loss percentage, strength of schedule, head-to-head results, results against common opponents, and results against teams included in the NCAA's final regional rankings.

Tournament bracket

* – Denotes overtime period

Top-left - Ashland, Virginia

Bottom-left - Alliance, Ohio

Top-right - Swarthmore, Pennsylvania

Bottom-right - Newport News, Virginia

Final Four

See also
 2023 NCAA Division I men's basketball tournament
 2023 NCAA Division II men's basketball tournament
 2023 NAIA men's basketball tournament
 2023 NCAA Division III women's basketball tournament

References

Ncaa Tournament
NCAA Division III men's basketball tournament
2023 in sports in Indiana